Orthodox Judaism is the collective term for the traditionalist and theologically conservative branches of contemporary Judaism. Theologically, it is chiefly defined by regarding the Torah, both Written and Oral, as revealed by God to Moses on Mount Sinai and faithfully transmitted ever since.

Orthodox Judaism, therefore, advocates a strict observance of Jewish law, or halakha, which is to be interpreted and determined exclusively according to traditional methods and in adherence to the continuum of received precedent through the ages. It regards the entire halakhic system as ultimately grounded in immutable revelation, and beyond external influence. Key practices are observing the Sabbath, eating kosher, and Torah study. Key doctrines include a future Messiah who will restore Jewish practice by building the temple in Jerusalem and gathering all the Jews to Israel, belief in a future bodily resurrection of the dead, divine reward and punishment for the righteous and the sinners.

Orthodox Judaism is not a centralized denomination. Relations between its different subgroups are sometimes strained, and the exact limits of Orthodoxy are subject to intense debate. Very roughly, it may be divided between Haredi Judaism, which is more conservative and reclusive, and Modern Orthodox Judaism, which is relatively open to outer society. Each of those is itself formed of independent communities. Together, they are almost uniformly exclusionist, regarding Orthodoxy not as a variety of Judaism, but as Judaism itself.

While adhering to traditional beliefs, the movement is a modern phenomenon. It arose as a result of the breakdown of the autonomous Jewish community since the 18th century, and was much shaped by a conscious struggle against the pressures of secularization and rival alternatives. The strictly observant and theologically aware Orthodox are a definite minority among all Jews, but there are also some semi- and non-practicing individuals who affiliate or identify with Orthodoxy. It is the largest Jewish religious group, estimated to have over 2 million practicing adherents, and at least an equal number of nominal members.

Definitions

The earliest known mention of the term Orthodox Jews was made in the Berlinische Monatsschrift in 1795. The word Orthodox was borrowed from the general German Enlightenment discourse, and used not to denote a specific religious group, but rather those Jews who opposed Enlightenment. During the early and mid-19th century, with the advent of the progressive movements among German Jews, and especially early Reform Judaism, the title Orthodox became the epithet of the traditionalists who espoused conservative positions on the issues raised by modernization. They themselves often disliked the alien, Christian name, preferring titles like "Torah-true" (gesetztreu), and often declared they used it only for the sake of convenience. The German Orthodox leader Rabbi Samson Raphael Hirsch referred to "the conviction commonly designated as Orthodox Judaism"; in 1882, when Rabbi Azriel Hildesheimer became convinced that the public understood that his philosophy and Liberal Judaism were radically different, he removed the word Orthodox from the name of his Hildesheimer Rabbinical Seminary. By the 1920s, the term became common and accepted even in Eastern Europe, and remains as such.

Orthodoxy perceives itself ideologically as the only authentic continuation of Judaism throughout the ages, as it was until the crisis of modernity; in many basic aspects, such as belief in the unadulterated divinity of the Torah or strict adherence to precedent and tradition when ruling in matters of Jewish Law, Orthodoxy is indeed so. Its progressive opponents often shared this view, regarding it as a fossilized remnant of the past and lending credit to their own rivals' ideology. Thus, the term Orthodox is often used generically to refer to traditional (even if only at the default sense, of being unrelated to the modernist non-Orthodox movements) synagogues, prayer rites, observances, and so forth.

However, academic research has taken a more nuanced approach, noting that the formation of Orthodox ideology and organizational frameworks was itself influenced by modernity. This was brought about by the need to defend and buttress the very concept of tradition, in a world where it was not self-evident anymore. When deep secularization and the dismantlement of communal structures uprooted the old order of Jewish life, traditionalist elements united to form groups which had a distinct self-understanding. This, and all that it entailed, constituted a notable change, for the Orthodox had to adapt to the new circumstances no less than anyone else; they developed novel, sometimes radically so, means of action and modes of thought. "Orthodoxization" was a contingent process, drawing from local circumstances and dependent on the extent of threat sensed by its proponents: a sharply-delineated Orthodox identity appeared in Central Europe, in Germany and Hungary, by the 1860s; a less stark one emerged in Eastern Europe during the Interwar period. Among the Jews of the Muslim lands, similar processes on a large scale only occurred around the 1970s, after they immigrated to Israel. Orthodoxy is often described as extremely conservative, ossifying a once-dynamic tradition due to the fear of legitimizing change. While this was not rarely true, its defining feature was not the forbidding of change and "freezing" Jewish heritage in its tracks, but rather the need to adapt to being but one segment of Judaism in a modern world inhospitable to traditional practice. Orthodoxy developed as a variegated "spectrum of reactions" – as termed by Benjamin Brown – involving in many cases much accommodation and leniency. Scholars nowadays, mainly since the mid-1980s, research Orthodox Judaism as a field in itself, examining how the need to confront modernity shaped and changed its beliefs, ideologies, social structure, and halakhic rulings, making it very much distinct from traditional Jewish society.

History

Modernity crisis

Until the latter half of the 18th century, Jewish communities in Central and Western Europe were autonomous entities, another estate in the corporate order of society, with their own distinct privileges and obligations. They were led by the affluent wardens' class (parnasim), and judicially subject to rabbinical courts, which ruled in most civil matters. The rabbinical class held the monopoly over education and morals, much like the Christian clergy. Jewish Law was considered normative and enforced upon obstinate transgressors (common sinning being rebuked, but tolerated) with all communal sanctions: imprisonment, taxation, flogging, pillorying, and, especially, excommunication. Cultural, economic, and social exchange with non-Jewish society was limited and regulated.

This state of affairs came to an end with the rise of the modern, centralized state, which sought to appropriate all authority. The nobility, clergy, urban guilds, and all other corporate estates were gradually stripped of their privileges, inadvertently creating a more equal and secularized society. The Jews were but one of the groups affected: Excommunication was banned, and rabbinic courts lost almost all their jurisdiction. The state, especially since the French Revolution, was more and more inclined to tolerate the Jews only as a religious sect, not as an autonomous entity, and sought to reform and integrate them as "useful subjects". Jewish emancipation and equal rights were also discussed. Thus, the Christian (and especially Protestant) differentiation between "religious" and "secular" was applied to Jewish affairs, to which these concepts were traditionally alien. The rabbis were bemused when the state expected them to assume pastoral cares, foregoing their principal role as judiciary. Of secondary importance, much less than the civil and legal transformations, were the ideas of Enlightenment which chafed at the authority of tradition and faith.

By the turn of the century, the weakened rabbinic establishment was facing masses of a new kind of transgressors: They could not be classified as tolerable sinners overcome by their urges (khote le-te'avon), or as schismatics like the Sabbateans or Frankists, against whom all communal sanctions were levied. Their attitudes did not fit the criteria set when faith was a normative and self-evident part of worldly life, but rested on the realities of a new, secularized age. The wardens' class, which wielded most power within the communities, was rapidly acculturating, and often sought to oblige the reforming agenda of the state. Rabbi Elazar Fleckeles, who returned to Prague from the countryside in 1783, recalled that he first faced there "new vices" of principled irreverence towards tradition, rather than "old vices" like gossip or fornication. In Hamburg, Rabbi Raphael Cohen attempted to reinforce traditional norms. Cohen ordered all the men in his community to grow a beard, forbade holding hands with one's wife in public, and decried women who wore wigs, instead of visible headgear, to cover their hair; Cohen taxed and otherwise persecuted members of the priestly caste who left the city to marry divorcees, men who appealed to state courts, those who ate food cooked by Gentiles, and other transgressors. Hamburg's Jews repeatedly appealed to the authorities, which eventually justified Cohen. However, the unprecedented meddling in his jurisdiction profoundly shocked him, and dealt a blow to the prestige of the rabbinate.

An ideological challenge to rabbinic authority, in contrast to prosaic secularization, appeared in the form of the Haskalah (Jewish Enlightenment) movement which came to the fore in 1782. Hartwig Wessely, Moses Mendelssohn, and other maskilim called for a reform of Jewish education, abolition of coercion in matters of conscience, and other modernizing measures. They bypassed rabbinic approval and set themselves, at least implicitly, as a rival intellectual elite. A bitter struggle ensued. Reacting to Mendelssohn's assertion that freedom of conscience must replace communal censure, Rabbi Cohen of Hamburg commented: 

However, maskilic-rabbinic rivalry ended rather soon in most Central Europe, for the governments imposed modernization upon their Jewish subjects, without regard to either party. Schools replaced traditional cheders, and standard German began to supplant Judeo-German. Differences between the establishment and the Enlightened became irrelevant, and the former often embraced the views of the latter (now antiquated, as more aggressive modes of acculturation replaced the Haskalah'''s program). In 1810, when philanthropist Israel Jacobson opened a reformed synagogue in Seesen, with a modernized ritual, he encountered little protest.

Hamburg Temple dispute

It was only the foundation of the Hamburg Temple in 1818 which mobilized the conservative elements. The organizers of the new Hamburg synagogue, who wished to appeal to acculturated Jews with a modernized ritual, openly defied not just the local rabbinic court that ordered them to desist but published learned tracts which castigated the entire rabbinical elite as hypocritical and obscurant. The moral threat they posed to rabbinic authority, as well as halakhic issues such as having a gentile play an organ on the Sabbath, were combined with severe theological issues. The Temple's revised prayer book omitted or rephrased petitions for the coming of the Messiah and renewal of sacrifices (post factum, it was considered as the first Reform liturgy). More than anything else, this doctrinal breach alarmed the traditionalists. Dozens of rabbis from across Europe united in support of the Hamburg rabbinic court, banning the major practices enacted there and offering halakhic grounds for forbidding any change in received custom. Most historians concur that the 1818–1821 Hamburg Temple dispute, with its concerted backlash against Reform and the emergence of a self-aware conservative ideology, marks the beginning of Orthodox Judaism.

The leader and organizer of the Orthodox camp during the dispute, and the most influential figure in early Orthodoxy, was Rabbi Moses Sofer of Pressburg, Hungary. Historian Jacob Katz regarded him as the first to fully grasp the realities of the modern age. Sofer understood that what remained of his political clout would soon disappear, and that he largely lost the ability to enforce observance; as Katz wrote, "obedience to halakha became dependent on recognizing its validity, and this very validity was challenged by those who did not obey". He was also deeply troubled by reports from his native Frankfurt and the arrival from the west of dismissed rabbis, ejected by progressive wardens, or pious families, fearing for the education of their children. These émigrés often became his ardent followers.

Sofer's response to the crisis of traditional Jewish society was unremitting conservatism, canonizing every detail of prevalent norms in the observant community lest any compromise legitimize the progressives' claim that the law was fluid or redundant. He was unwilling to trade halakhic opinions with those he considered as merely pretending to honor the rules of rabbinic discourse, while intending to undermine the very system. Sofer also awarded customs absolute validity, regarding them as uniformly equivalent to vows; he warned already in 1793 that even the "custom of ignoramuses" (one known to be rooted solely in a mistake of the common masses) was to be meticulously observed and revered. Sofer was frank and vehement about his conservative stance, stating during the Hamburg dispute that prayers in the vernacular were not particularly problematic, but he forbade them because they constituted an innovation. He succinctly expressed his attitude in a wordplay he borrowed from the Talmud: "The new (Chadash, originally meaning new grain) is forbidden by the Torah anywhere." Regarding the new, ideologically-driven sinners, Sofer commented in 1818 that they should have been anathemized and banished from the People Israel like the heretical sects of yore.

Unlike most, if not all, rabbis in Central Europe, who had little choice but to compromise, Sofer enjoyed unique circumstances. He, too, had to tread carefully during the 1810s, tolerating a modernized synagogue in Pressburg and other innovations, and his yeshiva was nearly closed by warden Wolf Breisach. But in 1822, three poor (and therefore traditional) members of the community, whose deceased apostate brother bequeathed them a large fortune, rose to the wardens' board. Breisach died soon after, and the Pressburg community became dominated by the conservatives. Sofer also possessed a strong base in the form of his yeshiva, the world's largest at the time, with hundreds of students. And crucially, the large and privileged Hungarian nobility blocked most imperial reforms in the backward country, including those relevant to the Jews. Hungarian Jewry retained its pre-modern character well into the first half of the 19th century, allowing Sofer's disciples to establish a score of new yeshivas, at a time when these institutions were rapidly closing in the west, and a strong rabbinate in the communities which appointed them. A generation later, a self-aware Orthodoxy was already well entrenched in the country. Hungarian Jewry gave rise both to Orthodoxy in general, in a sense of a comprehensive response to modernity, and specifically to the traditionalist, militant ultra-Orthodoxy.

The 1818–1821 controversy also elicited a very different response, which first arose in its very epicenter. Severe protests did not affect the Temple's congregants, eventually leading the wardens of Hamburg's Jewish community to a comprehensive compromise for the sake of unity. They dismissed the elderly, traditional Chief Dayan Baruch Oser and appointed Isaac Bernays. The latter was a university graduate, clean-shaven, and modernized, who could appeal to the acculturated and the young. Bernays signified a new era, and is believed by historians to be the first modern rabbi, fitting the demands of the emancipation: His contract forbade him to tax, punish, or employ coercion, and he lacked any political or judiciary power. He was also forbidden from interfering in the Temple's conduct. Though conservative in the principal issues of faith, in aesthetic, cultural, and civil matters, Bernays was a reformer and resembled the Temple leaders. He introduced secular studies for children, wore a cassock like a Protestant clergyman, and delivered frequent vernacular sermons. He forbade the spontaneous, informal character of synagogue conduct typical of Ashkenazi tradition, and ordered prayers to be somber and dignified. Bernays' style re-unified the Hamburg community by drawing most of the Temple's members back to the main synagogue, having had their aesthetic demands (rather than the theological ones, raised by a learned few) met.
 

The combination of religious conservatism and embrace of modernity in everything else was emulated elsewhere, earning the epithet "Neo-Orthodoxy". Bernays and his like-minded followers, such as Rabbi Jacob Ettlinger, fully accepted the platform of the moderate Haskalah, which now lost its progressive edge. While old-style traditional life was still quite extant in Germany until the 1840s, rapid secularization and acculturation turned Neo-Orthodoxy into the strict right-wing of German Jewry. It was fully articulated by Bernays' disciples Samson Raphael Hirsch and Azriel Hildesheimer, active in mid-century. Hirsch, a Hamburg native who was ten during the Temple dispute, combined fierce Orthodox dogmatism and militancy against rival interpretations of Judaism, with leniency on many modern issues and an elated embrace of German culture. Neo-Orthodoxy also spread to other parts and Western Europe.

While insisting on strict observance, the movement both tolerated and actively advocated modernization: Formal religious education for girls, virtually unheard of in traditional society, was introduced; modesty and gender separation were relaxed in favour of the prevalent norms of German society, while men went clean-shaven and dressed like their non-Jewish compatriots; and exclusive Torah study virtually disappeared, supplanted with more basic religious studies (while German Bildung was incorporated), which were to provide children with practical halakhic knowledge for life in the secular world. Synagogue ritual was reformed in semblance of prevalent aesthetic conceptions, much like non-Orthodox synagogues though without the ideological undertone, and the liturgy was often abbreviated. Neo-Orthodoxy mostly did not attempt to thoroughly reconcile its conduct and traditional halakhic or moral norms (which, among others, banned Torah study for women). Rather, it adopted compartmentalization, de facto limiting Judaism to the private and religious sphere, while yielding to outer society in the public sphere.For a concise introduction: Michael K. Silber, Orthodoxy, YIVO Encyclopedia of Jews in Eastern Europe. While conservative Rabbis in Hungary still thought in terms of the now-lost communal autonomy, the Neo-Orthodox acknowledged, at least de facto, the confessionalization of Judaism under emancipation, turning it from an all-encompassing structure defining every aspect of one's life, into a private religious conviction.

Wissenschaft des Judentums

In the late 1830s, modernist pressures in Germany shifted from the secularization debate, progressing even into the "purely religious" sphere of theology and liturgy. A new generation of young, modern university-trained rabbis (many German states already required communal rabbis to possess such education) sought to reconcile Judaism with the historical-critical study of scripture and the dominant philosophies of the day, especially Kant and Hegel. Influenced by the critical "Science of Judaism" (Wissenschaft des Judentums) pioneered by Leopold Zunz, and often in emulation of the Liberal Protestant milieu, they reexamined and undermined beliefs held as sacred in traditional circles, especially the notion of an unbroken chain from Sinai to the Sages. The more radical among the Wissenschaft rabbis, unwilling to either limit critical analysis or its practical application, coalesced around Rabbi Abraham Geiger to establish the full-fledged Reform Judaism. Between 1844 and 1846, Geiger organized three rabbinical synods in Braunschweig, Frankfurt and Breslau, to determine how to refashion Judaism in present times.

The Reform conferences were met with uproar by the Orthodox. Warden Hirsch Lehren of Amsterdam and Rabbi Jacob Ettlinger of Altona both organized anti-Reform manifestos, vehemently denouncing the new initiatives, signed by scores of rabbis from Europe and the Middle East. The tone of the undersigned varied considerably along geographic lines: letters from the traditional societies in Eastern Europe and the Ottoman Empire, implored local leaders to petition the authorities and have them ban the movement. Signatories from Central and Western Europe used terms commensurate with the liberal age. All were implored by the petitioners to be brief and accessible; complex halakhic arguments, intended to convince the rabbinic elite in past generations, were replaced by an appeal to the secularized masses, the new target audience.

The struggle with Wissenschaft criticism profoundly shaped the Orthodox. For centuries, Ashkenazi rabbinic authorities espoused Nahmanides' position that the Talmudic exegesis, which derived laws from the Torah's text by employing complex hermeneutics, was binding d'Oraita. Geiger and others presented exegesis as an arbitrary, illogical process, and consequently defenders of tradition embraced Maimonides' marginalized claim that the Sages merely buttressed already received laws with biblical citations, rather than actually deriving them through exegesis. As Jay Harris commented: "An insulated orthodox, or, rather, traditional rabbinate, feeling no pressing need to defend the validity of the Oral Law, could confidently appropriate the vision of most medieval rabbinic scholars; a defensive German Orthodoxy, by contrast, could not. ... Thus began a shift in understanding that led Orthodox rabbis and historians in the modern period to insist that the entire Oral Law was revealed by God to Moses at Sinai." 19th-Century Orthodox commentaries, like those authored by Malbim, invested great effort to amplify the notion that the Oral and Written Law were intertwined and inseparable.Wissenschaft posed a greater challenge to the modernized neo-Orthodox than to insulated traditionalist. Hirsch and Hildesheimer were divided on the matter, basically anticipating all modernist Orthodox attitudes to the historical-critical method. Hirsch argued that analyzing even the slightest minutiae of tradition as products of their historical context, was akin to denying the divine origin and timeless relevance of it all. Hildesheimer consented to research under limits, subjugating it to the predetermined sanctity of the subject matter and accepting its results only when they did not conflict with the latter. More importantly, while he was content to engage it academically, he utterly opposed its practical application in religious questions, where only traditional methods were to be used. Hildesheimer's approach was emulated by his disciple Rabbi David Zvi Hoffmann, who was both a scholar of note and a consummate apologetic. His polemic against the Graf-Wellhausen hypothesis (Hoffman declared that for him, the unity of the Pentateuch was a given, regardless of research) remains the classical Orthodox response to Higher Criticism. Hirsch often lambasted Hoffman for contextualizing rabbinic literature.

All of them stressed ceaselessly the importance of dogmatic adherence to Torah min ha-Shamayim, which led them to conflict with Rabbi Zecharias Frankel, Chancellor of the Jewish Theological Seminary of Breslau. Unlike the Reform camp, Frankel both insisted on strict observance and displayed great reverence towards tradition. But though regarded with much appreciation by many conservatives, his keen practice of Wissenschaft made him a suspect in the eyes of Hirsch and Hildesheimer. They demanded again and again that he unambiguously state his beliefs concerning the nature of revelation. In 1859, Frankel published a critical study of the Mishnah, and casually added that all commandments classified as "Law given to Moses at Sinai" were merely ancient customs accepted as such (he broadened Asher ben Jehiel's opinion). Hirsch and Hildesheimer seized the opportunity and launched a prolonged public campaign against him, accusing him of heresy. Concerned that public opinion regarded both neo-Orthodoxy and Frankel's "Positive-Historical School" centered at Breslau as similarly observant and traditionalist, the two stressed that the difference was dogmatic and not halakhic. They managed to tarnish Frankel's reputation in the traditional camp and make him illegitimate in the eyes of many. The Positive-Historical School is regarded by Conservative Judaism as an intellectual forerunner. While Hildesheimer cared to distinguish between Frankel's observant disciples and the proponents of Reform, he wrote in his diary: how meager is the principal difference between the Breslau School, who don silk gloves at their work, and Geiger who wields a sledgehammer.

Communal schism

During the 1840s in Germany, as traditionalists became a clear minority, some Orthodox rabbis, like Salomo Eger of Posen, urged to adopt Moses Sofer's position and anathemize the principally nonobservant. Eating, worshipping or marrying with them were to be banned. Rabbi Jacob Ettlinger, whose journal Treue Zionswächter was the first regular Orthodox newspaper (signifying the coalescence of a distinct Orthodox milieu), refused to heed their call. Ettlinger, and German neo-Orthodoxy in his steps, chose to regard the modern secularized Jew as a transgressor and not as a schismatic. He adopted Maimonides' interpretation of the Talmudic concept tinok shenishba (captured infant), a Jew by birth who was not raised as such and therefore could be absolved for not practicing the Law, and greatly expanded it to serve the Orthodox need to tolerate the nonobservant majority (many of their own congregants were far removed from strict practice). For example, he allowed to drink wine poured by Sabbath desecrators, and to ignore other halakhic sanctions. Yet German neo-Orthodoxy could not legitimize nonobservance, and adopted a complex hierarchical approach, softer than traditional sanctions but no less intent on differentiating between sinners and righteous. Reform rabbis or lay leaders, considered ideological opponents, were castigated, while the common mass was to be handled carefully.

Some German neo-Orthodox believed that while doomed to a minority status in their native country, their ideology could successfully confront modernity and unify Judaism in the more traditional communities to the east. In 1847, Hirsch was elected Chief Rabbi of Moravia, where old rabbinic culture and yeshivas were still extant. He soon found his expectations dashed: The traditionalist rabbis scorned him for his European manners and lack of Talmudic acumen, and were enraged by his attempts to impose synagogue reform and to establish a modern rabbinical seminary with comprehensive secular studies. The progressives viewed him as too conservative. After just four years of constant strife, he utterly lost faith in the possibility of reuniting the broad Jewish public. In 1851, a small group in Frankfurt am Main which opposed the Reform character of the Jewish community turned to Hirsch. He led them for the remainder of his life, finding Frankfurt an ideal location to implement his unique ideology, which amalgamated acculturation, dogmatic theology, thorough observance and now also strict secessionism from the non-Orthodox.

In the very same year, Hildesheimer set out for Hungary. Confounded by rapid urbanization and acculturation – which gave rise to what was known as "Neology", a nonobservant laity served by rabbis who mostly favoured the Positive-Historical approach – the elderly local rabbis at first welcomed Hildesheimer. He opened a modern school in Eisenstadt, which combined secular and religious studies, and traditionalists such as Moshe Schick and Yehudah Aszód sent their sons there. Samuel Benjamin Sofer, the heir of late Hatam Sofer, considered appointing Hildesheimer as his assistant-rabbi in Pressburg and instituting secular studies in the city's great yeshiva. The rabbi of Eisenstadt believed that only a full-fledged modern rabbinical seminary will serve to fulfill his neo-Orthodox agenda. In the 1850s and 1860s, however, a radical reactionary Orthodox party coalesced in the backward northeastern regions of Hungary. Led by Rabbi Hillel Lichtenstein, his son-in-law Akiva Yosef Schlesinger and decisor Chaim Sofer, the "zealots" were deeply shocked by the demise of the traditional world into which they were born. Like Moses Sofer a generation before them, these Orthodox émigré left the acculturating west and moved east, to a yet pre-modern environment which they were determined to safeguard. Lichtenstein ruled out any compromise with modernity, insisting of maintaining Yiddish and traditional dress; they considered the Neologs as already beyond the pale of Judaism, and were more concerned with neo-Orthodoxy, which they regarded as a thinly-veiled gateway for a similar fate. Chaim Sofer summarized their view of Hildesheimer: The wicked Hildesheimer is the horse and chariot of the Evil Inclination... All the heretics in the last century did not seek to undermine the Law and the Faith as he does.In their struggle against acculturation, the Hungarian ultra-Orthodox found themselves hard pressed to provide strong halakhic arguments. Michael Silber wrote: These issues, even most of the religious reforms, fell into gray areas not easily treated within Halakha. It was often too flexible or ambiguous, at times silent, or worse yet, embarrassingly lenient. Schlesinger was forced to venture outside of normative law, into the mystical writings and other fringe sources, to buttress his ideology. Most Hungarian Orthodox rabbis, while sympathetic to the "zealots"' cause, dismissed their legal arguments. In 1865, the ultra-Orthodox convened in Nagymihály and issued a ban on various synagogue reforms, intended not against the Neologs but against developments in the Orthodox camp, especially after Samuel Sofer violated his father's expressed ban and instituted German-language sermons in Pressburg. Schick, the country's most prominent decisor, and other leading rabbis refused to sign, though they did not publicly oppose the decree. Hildesheimer's planned seminary was also too radical for the mainstream rabbis, and he became marginalized and isolated by 1864.

The internal Orthodox division was conflated by growing tension with the Neologs. In 1869, the Hungarian government convened a General Jewish Congress which was aimed at creating a national representative body. Fearing Neolog domination, the Orthodox seceded from the Congress and appealed to Parliament in the name of religious freedom – this demonstrated a deep internalization of the new circumstances; just in 1851, Orthodox leader Meir Eisenstaedter petitioned the authorities to restore the coercive powers of the communities. In 1871 the government recognized a separate Orthodox national committee. Communities which refused to join either side, labeled "Status Quo", were subject to intense Orthodox condemnation. Yet the Orthodox tolerated countless nonobservant Jews as long as they affiliated with the national committee: Adam Ferziger stressed that membership and loyalty to one of the respective organizations, rather than beliefs and ritual behavior, emerged as the definitive manifestation of Jewish identity. The Hungarian schism was the most radical internal separation among the Jews of Europe. Hildesheimer left back to Germany soon after, disillusioned though not as pessimistic as Hirsch. He was appointed rabbi of the small Orthodox sub-community in Berlin (which had separate religious institutions but was not formally independent of the Liberal majority), where he finally established his seminary.

In 1877, a law enabling Jews to secede from their communities without conversion – again, a stark example that Judaism was now confessional, not corporate – was passed in Germany. Hirsch withdrew his congregation from the Frankfurt community and decreed that all the Orthodox should do the same. However, even in Frankfurt he encountered dismissal. Unlike the heterogeneous communities of Hungary, which often consisted of recent immigrants, Frankfurt and most German communities were close-knit. The majority of Hirsch's congregants enlisted Rabbi Seligman Baer Bamberger, who was older and more conservative. Bamberger was both concerned with the principal of unity among the People Israel and dismissive of Hirsch, whom he regarded as unlearned and overly acculturated. He decreed that since the mother community was willing to finance Orthodox services and allow them religious freedom, secession was unwarranted. Eventually, less than 80 families from Hirsch's 300-strong congregation followed their own rabbi. The vast majority of the 15%–20% of German Jews affiliated with Orthodox institutions cared little for the polemic, and did not secede due to prosaic reasons of finance and familial relations. Only a handful of Secessionist, Austrittorthodox, communities were established in the Reich; almost everyone remained as Communal Orthodox, Gemeindeortodox, within Liberal mother congregations. The Communal Orthodox argued that their approach was both true to Jewish unity, and decisive in maintaining public standards of observance and traditional education in Liberal communities, while the Secessionists viewed them as hypocritical middle-of-the-roaders.

The fierce conflicts in Hungary and Germany, and the emergence of distinctly Orthodox communities and ideologies, were the exception rather than the rule in Central and Western Europe. France, Britain, Bohemia, Austria and other countries saw both a virtual disappearance of observance and a lack of serious interest in bridging Judaism and modernity. The official rabbinate remained technically traditional, at least in the default sense of not introducing ideological change. The organ – a symbol of Reform in Germany since 1818, so much that Hildesheimer seminarians had to sign a declaration that they will never serve in a synagogue which introduced one – was accepted (not just for weekday use but also on the Sabbath) with little qualm by the French Consistoire in 1856, as part of a series of synagogue regulations passed by Chief Rabbi Salomon Ulmann. Even Rabbi Solomon Klein of Colmar, the leader of Alsatian conservatives who partook in the castigation of Zecharias Frankel, had the instrument in his community. In England, Rabbi Nathan Marcus Adler's shared a very similar approach: It was vehemently conservative in principle and combated ideological reformers, yet served a nonobservant public – as Todd Endelman noted, While respectful of tradition, most English-born Jews were not orthodox in terms of personal practice. Nonetheless they were content to remain within an orthodox congregational framework – and introduced considerable synagogue reforms.

Eastern Europe
The much belated pace of modernization in Russia, Congress Poland and the Romanian principalities, where harsh discrimination and active persecution of the Jews continued until 1917, delayed the crisis of traditional society for decades. Old-style education in the heder and yeshiva remained the norm, retaining Hebrew as the language of the elite and Yiddish as the vernacular. The defining fault-line of Eastern European Jews was between the Hasidim and the Misnagdic reaction against them. Reform attempts by the Czar's government, like the school modernization under Max Lilienthal or the foundation of rabbinical seminaries and the mandating of communities to appoint clerks known as "official rabbis", all had little influence. Communal autonomy and the rabbinic courts' jurisdiction were abolished in 1844, but economic and social seclusion remained, ensuring the authority of Jewish institutions and traditions de facto. In 1880, there were only 21,308 Jewish pupils in government schools, out of some 5 million Jews in total; In 1897, 97% of the 5.2 million Jews in the Pale of Settlement and Congress Poland declared Yiddish their mother tongue, and only 26% possessed any literacy in Russian. Though the Eastern European Haskalah challenged the traditional establishment – unlike its western counterpart, no acculturation process turned it irrelevant; it flourished from the 1820s until the 1890s – the latter's hegemony over the vast majority was self-evident. The leading rabbis maintained the old conception of communal unity: In 1882, when an Orthodox party in Galicia appealed for the right of secession, the Netziv and other Russian rabbis declared it forbidden and contradicting the idea of Israel's oneness.

While slow, change was by no means absent. In the 1860s and 1870s, anticipating a communal disintegration like the one in the west, moderate maskilic rabbis like Yitzchak Yaacov Reines and Yechiel Michel Pines called for inclusion of secular studies in the heders and yeshivas, a careful modernization, and an ecumenical attempt to form a consensus on necessary adaptation of halakha to novel times. Their initiative was thwarted by a combination of strong anti-traditional invective on behalf of the radical, secularist maskilim and conservative intransigence from the leading rabbis, especially during the bitter polemic which erupted after Moshe Leib Lilienblum's 1868 call for a reconsideration of Talmudic strictures. Reines, Pines and their associates would gradually form the nucleus of Religious Zionism, while their conservative opponents would eventually adopt the epithet Haredim (then, and also much later, still a generic term for the observant and the pious).

The attitude toward Jewish nationalism, particularly Zionism, and its nonobservant if not staunchly secularist leaders and partisans, was the key question facing the traditionalists of Eastern Europe. Closely intertwined were issues of modernization in general: As noted by Joseph Salmon, the future religious Zionists (organized in the Mizrahi since 1902) were not only supportive of the national agenda per se, but deeply motivated by criticism of the prevalent Jewish society, a positive reaction to modernity and a willingness to tolerate nonobservance while affirming traditional faith and practice. Their proto-Haredi opponents sharply rejected all of the former positions and espoused staunch conservatism, which idealized existing norms. Any illusion that differences could be blanded and a united observant pro-Zionist front would be formed, were dashed between 1897 and 1899, as both the Eastern European nationalist intellectuals and Theodor Herzl himself revealed an uncompromising secularist agenda, forcing traditionalist leaders to pick sides. In 1900, the anti-Zionist pamphlet Or la-Yesharim, endorsed by many Russian and Polish rabbis, largely demarcated the lines between the proto-Haredi majority and the Mizrahi minority, and terminated dialogue; in 1911, when the 10th World Zionist Congress voted in favour of propagating non-religious cultural work and education, a large segment of the Mizrahi seceded and joined the anti-Zionists.

In 1907, Eastern European proto-Haredi elements formed the Knesseth Israel party, a modern framework created in recognition of the deficiencies of existing institutions. It dissipated within a year. German Neo-Orthodoxy, in the meantime, developed a keen interest in the traditional Jewish masses of Russian and Poland; if at the past they were considered primitive, a disillusionment with emancipation and enlightenment made many young assimilated German Orthodox youth embark on journeys to East European yeshivot, in search of authenticity. The German secessionists already possessed a platform of their own, the Freie Vereinigung für die Interessen des Orthodoxen Judentums, founded by Samson Raphael Hirsch in 1885.  In 1912, two German FVIOJ leaders, Isaac Breuer and Jacob Rosenheim, managed to organize a meeting of 300 seceding Mizrahi, proto-Haredi and secessionist Neo-Orthodox delegate in Katowice, creating the Agudath Israel party. While the Germans were a tiny minority in comparison to the Eastern Europeans, their modern education made them a prominent elite in the new organization, which strove to provide a comprehensive response to world Jewry's challenges in a strictly observant spirit. The Agudah immediately formed its Council of Torah Sages as supreme rabbinic leadership body. Many ultra-traditionalist elements in Eastern Europe, like the Belz and Lubavitch Hasidim, refused to join, viewing the movement as a dangerous innovation; and the organized Orthodox in Hungary rejected it as well, especially after it did not affirm a commitment to communal secession in 1923.

In the Interwar period, sweeping secularization and acculturation deracinated old Jewish society in Eastern Europe. The October Revolution granted civil equality and imposed anti-religious persecutions, radically transforming Russian Jewry within a decade; the lifting of formal discrimination also strongly affected the Jews of independent Poland, Lithuania and other states. In the 1930s, it was estimated that no more than 20%–33% of Poland's Jews, the last stronghold of traditionalism where many were still living in rural and culturally-secluded communities, could be considered strictly observant. Only upon having become an embattled (though still quite large) minority, did the local traditionalists complete their transformation into Orthodox, albeit never as starkly as in Hungary or Germany. Eastern European Orthodoxy, whether Agudah or Mizrahi, always preferred cultural and educational independence to communal secession, and maintained strong ties and self-identification with the general Jewish public. Within its ranks, the 150-years-long struggle between Hasidim and Misnagdim was largely subsided; the latter were even dubbed henceforth as "Litvaks", as the anti-Hasidic component in their identity was marginalized. In the interwar period, Rabbi Yisrael Meir Kagan emerged as the popular leader of the Eastern European Orthodox, particularly the Agudah-leaning.

United States

American Jewry of the 19th century, small and lacking traditional institutions or strong rabbinic presence due to its immigrant-based nature, was a hotbed of religious innovation. Voluntary congregations, rather than corporate communities, were the norm; separation of church and state, and dynamic religiosity of the independent Protestant model, shaped synagogue life. In the mid-19th century, Reform Judaism spread rapidly, advocating a formal relinquishment of traditions very few in the secularized, open environment observed anyhow; the United States would be derisively named the Treife Medina, or "Profane Country", in Yiddish. Conservative elements, concerned mainly with public standards of observance in critical fields like marriage, rallied around Isaac Leeser. Lacking a rabbinic ordination and little knowledgeable by European standards, Leeser was an ultra-traditionalist in his American milieu. In 1845 he introduced the words "Orthodox" and "Orthodoxy" into the American Jewish discourse, in the sense of opposing Reform; while admiring Samson Raphael Hirsch, Leeser was an even stauncher proponent of Zecharias Frankel, whom he considered the "leader of the Orthodox party" at a time when Positive-Historical and Orthodox positions were barely discernible from each other to most observers (in 1861, Leeser defended Frankel in the polemic instigated by Hirsch).

Indeed, a broad non-Reform, relatively traditional camp slowly coalesced as the minority within American Jewry; while strict in relation to their progressive opponents, they served a nonobservant public and instituted thorough synagogue reforms – omission of piyyutim from the liturgy, English-language sermons and secular education for the clergy were the norm in most, and many Orthodox synagogues in America did not partition men and women. In 1885, the antinomian Pittsburgh Platform moved a broad coalition of conservative religious leaders to found the Jewish Theological Seminary of America. They variously termed their ideology, which was never consistent and mainly motivated by a rejection of Reform, as "Enlightened Orthodoxy" or "Conservative Judaism". The latter term would only gradually assume a clearly distinct meaning.

To their right, strictly traditionalist Eastern European immigrants formed the Union of Orthodox Rabbis in 1902, in direct opposition to the Americanized character of the OU and JTS. The UOR frowned upon English-language sermons, secular education and acculturation in general. Even before that, in 1897, an old-style yeshiva, RIETS, was founded in New York. Eventually, its students rebelled in 1908, demanding a modern rabbinic training much like that of their peers in JTS. In 1915, RIETS was reorganized as a decidedly Modern Orthodox institution, and a merger with the JTS was also discussed. In 1923, the Rabbinical Council of America was established as the clerical association of the OU.

Only in the postwar era, did the vague traditional coalition come to a definite end. During and after the Holocaust, a new wave of strictly observant refugees arrived from Eastern and Central Europe. They often regarded even the UOR as too lenient and Americanized. Typical of these was Rabbi Aaron Kotler, who established Lakewood Yeshiva in New Jersey during 1943. Alarmed by the enticing American environment, Kotler turned his institution into an enclave, around which an entire community slowly evolved. It was very different from his prewar yeshiva at Kletsk, Poland, the students of which were but a segment of the general Jewish population and mingled with the rest of the population. Lakewood pioneered the homogeneous, voluntary and enclavist model of postwar Haredi communities, which were independent entities with their own developing subculture. The new arrivals soon dominated the traditionalist wing of American Jewry, forcing the locals to adopt more rigorous positions. Concurrently, the younger generation in the JTS and the Rabbinical Assembly demanded greater clarity, theological unambiguity and halakhic independence from the Orthodox veto on serious innovations — in 1935, for example, the RA yielded to such pressures and shelved its proposal for a solution to the agunah predicament. "Conservative Judaism", now adopted as an exclusive label by most JTS graduates and RA members, became a truly distinct movement. In 1950, the Conservatives signaled their break with Orthodox halakhic authorities, with the acceptance of a far-reaching legal decision, which allowed one to drive to the synagogue and to use electricity on Sabbath.

Between the ultra-Orthodox and Conservatives, Modern Orthodoxy in America also coalesced, becoming less a generic term and more a distinct movement. Its leader in the postwar era, Rabbi Joseph B. Soloveitchik, left Agudas Israel to adopt both pro-Zionist positions and a positive, if reserved, attitude toward Western culture. As dean of RIETS and honorary chair of RCA's halakha committee, Soloveitchik shaped Modern Orthodoxy for decades. While ideological differences with the Conservatives were clear, as the RCA stressed the divinely revealed status of the Torah and a strict observance of halakha, sociological boundaries were less so. Many members of the Modern Orthodox public were barely observant, and a considerable number of communities did not install a gender partition in their synagogues – physically separate seating became the distinguishing mark of Orthodox/Conservative affiliation in the 1950s, and was strongly promulgated by the RCA – for many years. As late as 1997, seven OU congregations still lacked a partition.

Theology
Orthodox attitudes
A definite and conclusive credo was never formulated in Judaism; the very question whether it contains any equivalent of dogma is a matter of scholarly controversy. Some researchers attempted to argue that the importance of daily practice and punctilious adherence to halakha (Jewish law) relegated theoretical issues to an ancillary status. Others dismissed this view entirely, citing the debates in ancient rabbinic sources which castigated various heresies with little reference to observance. However, while lacking a uniform doctrine, Orthodox Judaism is basically united in affirming several core beliefs, disavowal of which is considered major blasphemy. As in other aspects, Orthodox positions reflect the mainstream of traditional Rabbinic Judaism through the ages.

Attempts to codify these beliefs were undertaken by several medieval authorities, including Saadia Gaon and Joseph Albo. Each composed his own creed. Yet, the 13 principles expounded by Maimonides in his Commentary on the Mishna, authored in the 1160s, eventually proved the most widely accepted. Various points – for example, Albo listed merely three fundamentals, and did not regard the Messiah as a key tenet – the exact formulation, and the status of disbelievers (whether mere errants, or heretics who can no longer be considered part of the People Israel) were contested by many of Maimonides' contemporaries and later sages. Many of their detractors did so from a maximalist position, arguing that the entire corpus of the Torah and the sayings of ancient sages were of canonical stature, not just certain selected beliefs. But in recent centuries, the 13 Principles became standard, and are considered binding and cardinal by Orthodox authorities in a virtually universal manner.

During the Middle Ages, two systems of thought competed for theological primacy, their advocates promoting them as explanatory foundations for the observance of the Law. One was the rationalist-philosophic school, which endeavored to present all commandments as serving higher moral and ethical purposes, while the other was the mystical tradition, exemplified in Kabbalah, which assigned each rite with a role in the hidden dimensions of reality. Sheer obedience, without much thought and derived from faithfulness to one's community and ancestry, was believed fit only for the common people, while the educated classes chose either of the two schools. In the modern era, the prestige of both suffered severe blows, and "naive faith" became popular. At a time when excessive contemplation in matters of belief was associated with secularization, luminaries such as Yisrael Meir Kagan stressed the importance of simple, unsophisticated commitment to the precepts passed down from the Beatified Sages. This is still the standard in the ultra-Orthodox world.

God

Orthodox Judaism adheres to monotheism, the belief in one God. The basic tenets of Orthodoxy, drawn from ancient sources like the Talmud as well as later sages, prominently and chiefly include the attributes of God in Judaism: one and indivisible, preceding all creation which he alone brought into being, eternal, omniscient, omnipotent, absolutely incorporeal, and beyond human reason. This basis is evoked in many foundational texts, and is repeated often in the daily prayers, such as in Judaism's creed-like Shema Yisrael: "Hear, O Israel, the Lord is our God, the Lord is One."

Maimonides delineated this understanding of a monotheistic, personal God in the opening six articles of his thirteen. The six concern God's status as the sole creator, his oneness, his impalpability, that he is first and last, that God alone, and no other being, may be worshipped, and that he is omniscient. The supremacy of the God of Israel is even applied on non-Jews, who, according to most rabbinic opinions, are banned from the worship of other deities, though they are allowed to "associate" lower divine beings in their faith in God (this notion was mainly used to allow contact with Christians, proving they were not idolaters with whom any business dealings and the like are forbidden.)

The utter imperceptibility of God, considered as beyond human reason and only reachable through what he chose to reveal, was emphasized among others in the ancient ban on making any image of him. Maimonides and virtually all sages in his time and since then also stressed that the creator is incorporeal, lacking "any semblance of a body"; while almost taken for granted since the Middle Ages, Maimonides and his contemporaries noted that anthropomorphic conceptions of God were quite common in their time.

The medieval tension between God's transcendence and equanimity, on the one hand, and his contact and interest in his creation, on the other hand, found its most popular resolution in the esoteric Kabbalah. The Kabbalists asserted that while God himself is beyond the universe, he progressively unfolds into the created realm via a series of inferior emanations, or sefirot, each a refraction of the perfect godhead. While widely received, this system also proved contentious and some authorities lambasted it as a threat to God's unity. In modern times it is upheld, at least tacitly, in many traditionalist Orthodox circles, while Modern Orthodoxy mostly ignores it without confronting the notion directly.

Revelation
The defining doctrine of Orthodox Judaism is the belief that the Torah ("Teaching" or "Law"), both the written scripture of the Pentateuch and the oral tradition explicating it, was revealed by God to Moses on Mount Sinai, and that it was transmitted faithfully from Sinai in an unbroken chain ever since. One of the foundational texts of rabbinic literature is the list opening the Ethics of the Fathers, enumerating the sages who received and passed on the Torah, from Moses through Joshua, the Elders, and Prophets, and then onward until Hillel the Elder and Shammai. This core belief is referred to in classical sources as "The Law/Teaching is from the Heavens" (Torah min HaShamayim).

The basic philosophy of Orthodoxy is that the body of revelation is total and complete; its interpretation and application under new circumstances, required of scholars in every generation, is conceived as an act of inferring and elaborating based on already prescribed methods, not of innovation or addition. One clause in the Jerusalem Talmud asserts that anything which a veteran disciple shall teach was already given at Sinai; and a story in the Babylonian Talmud claims that upon seeing the immensely intricate deduction of future Rabbi Akiva in a vision, Moses himself was at loss, until Akiva proclaimed that everything he teaches was handed over to Moses. The Written and Oral Torah are believed to be intertwined and mutually reliant, for the latter is a source to many of the divine commandments, and the text of the Pentateuch is seen as incomprehensible in itself. God's will may only be surmised by appealing to the Oral Torah revealing the text's allegorical, anagogical, or tropological meaning, not by literalist reading.

Lacunae in received tradition or disagreements between early sages are attributed to disruptions, especially persecutions which caused to that "the Torah was forgotten in Israel" — according to rabbinic lore, these eventually compelled the legists to write down the Oral Law in the Mishna and Talmud. Yet, the wholeness of the original divine message, and the reliability of those who transmitted it through the ages, are axiomatic. One of the primary intellectual exercises of Torah scholars is to locate discrepancies between Talmudic or other passages and then demonstrate by complex logical steps (presumably proving each passage referred to a slightly different situation etc.) that there is actually no contradiction. Like other traditional, non-liberal religions, Orthodox Judaism considers revelation as propositional, explicit, verbal and unambiguous, that may serve as a firm source of authority for a set of religious commandments. Modernist understandings of revelation as a subjective, humanly-conditioned experience are rejected by the Orthodox mainstream, though some thinkers at the end of the liberal wing did try to promote such views, finding virtually no acceptance from the establishment.

An important ramification of Torah min HaShamayim in modern times is the reserved, and often totally rejectionist, attitude of Orthodoxy toward the historical-critical method, particularly higher criticism of the Bible. A refusal by rabbis to significantly employ such tools in determining halakhic decisions, and insistence on traditional methods and the need for consensus and continuity with past authorities, is a demarcation line separating the most liberal-leaning Orthodox rabbinic circles from the most right-wing non-Orthodox ones.

While the Sinaitic event is perceived as the supreme and binding act of revelation, it is not the only one. Rabbinic tradition acknowledges matter handed down from the Prophets, as well as announcements from God later on. Secret lore or Kabbalah, allegedly revealed to illustrious figures in the past and passed on through elitist circles, is widely (albeit not universally) esteemed. While not a few prominent rabbis deplored Kabbalah, and considered it a late forgery, most generally accepted it as legitimate. However, its status in determining normative halakhic decision-making, which is binding for the entire community, and not just intended for spiritualists who voluntarily adopt kabbalistic strictures, was always highly controversial. Leading decisors openly applied criteria from Kabbalah in their rulings, while others did so only inadvertently, and many denied it any role in normative halakha. A closely related mystical phenomenon is the belief in Magidim, supposed dreamlike apparitions or visions, that may inform those who experience them with certain divine knowledge.

Eschatology

Belief in a future Messiah is central to Orthodox Judaism. According to this doctrine, a king will arise from King David's lineage, and will bring with him signs such as the restoration of the Temple, peace, and universal acceptance of the God of Israel. The Messiah will embark on a quest to gather all Jews to the Holy Land, will proclaim prophethood, and will restore the Davidic Monarchy.

Classical Judaism did incorporate a tradition of belief in the resurrection of the dead. There is scriptural basis for this doctrine, quoted by the Mishnah: "All Israelites have a share in the World-to-Come, as it is written: And your people, all of them righteous, Shall possess the land for all time; They are the shoot that I planted,  My handiwork in which I glory (Isa 60:21)." The Mishnah also brands as heretics any Jew who rejects the doctrine of resurrection or its origin from the Torah. Those who deny the doctrine are deemed to receive no share in the World-to-Come. The Pharisees believed in both a bodily resurrection and the immortality of the soul. They also believed that acts in this world would affect the state of life in the next world. The Mishnah Sahendrin 10 clarifies that only those who follow the correct theology will have a place in the World to Come.

There are other passing references to the afterlife in Mishnaic tractates. A particularly important one in the Berakhot informs that the Jewish belief in the afterlife was established long before the compilation of the Mishnah.  Biblical tradition categorically mentions Sheol sixty-five times. It is described as an underworld containing the gathering of the dead with their families. Numbers 16:30 states that Korah went into Sheol alive, to describe his death in divine retribution. The deceased who reside in Sheol have a "nebulous" existence and there is no reward or punishment in Sheol, which is represented as a dark and gloomy place. But a distinction is made for kings who are said to be greeted by other kings when entering Sheol. Biblical poetry suggests that resurrection from Sheol is possible. Prophetic narratives of resurrection in the Bible have been labelled as an external cultural influence by some scholars.

The Talmudic discourse expanded on the details of the World to Come. This was to motivate Jewish compliance with their religious codes. In brief, the righteous will be rewarded with a place in Gan Eden, the wicked will be punished in Gehinnom, and the resurrection will take place in the Messianic age. The sequence of these events is unclear. Rabbis have supported the concept of resurrection with plenteous Biblical citations, and have shown it as a sign of God's omnipotence.

 Practice 
Intensity
A relatively thorough observance of halakha – rather than any theological and doctrinal matters, which are often subject to diverse opinions – is the concrete demarcation line separating Orthodox Jews from other Jewish movements. As noted both by researchers and communal leaders, the Orthodox subgroups have a sense of commitment towards the Law, perceiving it as seriously binding, which is rarely manifest outside the movement.

Law, custom, and tradition
The halakha, like any jurisprudence, is not a definitive set of rules, but rather an ever-expanding discourse: Its authority is derived from the belief in divine revelation, but interpretation and application are done by the rabbis, who base their mandate on biblical verses such as and thou shalt observe to do according to all that they inform thee. From ancient to modern times, the rabbinic discourse was wrought with controversy (machloket) and sages disagreeing upon various points of the law. The Talmud itself is mainly a record of such disputes. The traditional belief, maintained by the Orthodox today, regards such disagreement as flowing naturally from the divinity of Jewish Law, which is presumed to potentially contain a solution for any possible predicament. As long as both contesting parties base their arguments according to received hermeneutics and precedents and are driven by sincere faith, both these and those are the words of the Living God (this Talmudic statement is originally attributed to a divine proclamation during a dispute between the House of Hillel and House of Shammai). Majority opinions were accepted and canonized, though many old disagreements remain and new ones appear ceaselessly. This plurality of opinion allows decisors, rabbis tasked with determining the legal stance in subjects without precedent, to weigh between a range of options, based on methods derived from earlier authorities. The most basic form of halakhic discourse is the responsa literature, in which rabbis answered questions directed from commoners or other rabbis, thus setting precedent for the next generations.

The system's oldest and most basic sources are the Mishna and the two Talmuds, to which were added the later commentaries and novellae of the Geonim. Those were followed by the great codes which sought to assemble and standardize the laws, including Rabbi Isaac Alfasi's Hilchot HaRif, Maimonides' Mishneh Torah, and Rabbi Asher ben Jehiel's work (colloquially called the Rosh). These three works in particular were the main basis of Rabbi Jacob ben Asher's Arba'ah Turim, which in turn became the basis of one of the latest and most authoritative codifications - the 1565 Shulchan Aruch, or "Set Table," by Rabbi Joseph Karo. This work gained a canonical status and became almost synonymous, in popular parlance, with the halakhic system itself – though no later authority accepted it in its entirety (for example, all Orthodox Jews don phylacteries in a manner different from the one advocated there), and it was immediately contested or re-interpreted by various commentaries, most prominently the gloss written by Rabbi Moses Isserles named HaMapah ("The Tablecloth"). Halakhic literature continued to expand and evolve, with new authoritative guides being compiled and canonized, until the popular works of the 20th century like the Mishnah Berurah.

The most important distinction within halakha is between all laws derived from God's revelation (d'Oraita); and those enacted by human authorities (d'Rabanan), who is believed traditionally to have been empowered by God to legislate when necessary. The former are either directly understood, derived in various hermeneutical means or attributed to commandments orally handed down to Moses. The authority to pass measures d'Rabanan is itself subject to debate – for one, Maimonides stated that absolute obedience to rabbinic decrees is stipulated by the verse and thou shalt observe, while Nachmanides argued that such severeness is unfounded – though such enactments are accepted as binding, albeit less than the divine commandments. A Talmudic maxim states that when in doubt regarding a matter d'Oraita, one must rule strenuously, and leniently when it concerns d'Rabanan. Many arguments in halakhic literature revolve over whether any certain detail is derived from the former or the latter source, and under which circumstances. Commandments or prohibitions d'Rabanan, though less stringent than d'Oraita ones, are an equally important facet of Jewish law. They range from the 2nd century BCE establishment of Hanukkah, to the bypassing on the Biblical ban on charging interest via the Prozbul, and up to the 1950 standardization of marital rules by the Chief Rabbinate of Israel which forbade polygamy and levirate marriage even in communities which still practiced those.

Apart from these, a third major component buttressing Orthodox practice (and Jewish in general) is local or familial custom, Minhag. The development and acceptance of customs as binding, more than disagreements between decisors, is the main factor accounting for the great diversity in matters of practice across geographic or ethnic lines. While the reverence accorded to Minhag across rabbinic literature is far from uniform – ranging from positions like "a custom may uproot halakha" to wholly dismissive attitudes – it was generally accepted as binding by the scholars, and more importantly, drew its power from popular adherence and routine.

The most important aspect of Minhag is in the disparities between various Jewish ethnic or communal groups, which also each possess a distinctive tradition of halakhic rulings, stemming from the opinions of local rabbis. Ashkenazim, Sephardim, Teimanim, and others have different prayer rites, somewhat different kosher emphases (for example, since the 12th century at least, it became an Ashkenazi custom not to consume legumes in Passover), and numerous other points of distinction. So do, for example, Hasidic Jews and non-Hasidic ("Yeshivish" or "Litvish") ones, though both originate from Eastern Europe.

Eating in the Sukkah on Shemini Atzeret is an area where Minhag varies; likewise, how to accommodate the idea of eating some dairy on Shavuos. The influence of custom even elicited the complaint of scholars who noted that the common masses observe Minhag, yet ignore important divine decrees.

Rabbinic authority

Rabbinic leadership, assigned with implementing and interpreting the already accumulated tradition, changed considerably in recent centuries, marking a major difference between Orthodox and pre-modern Judaism. Since the demise of the Geonim, who led the Jewish world up to 1038, halakha was adjudicated locally, and the final arbiter was mostly the communal rabbi, the Mara d'Athra (Master of the Area). He was responsible to judicially instruct all members of his community. The emancipation and modern means of transport and communication all jointly made this model untenable. While Orthodox communities, especially the more conservative ones, have rabbis who technically fill this capacity, the public generally follows well-known luminaries whose authority is not limited by geography, and based on reverence and peer pressure more than the now-defunct legal coercion of the old community. These may be either popular chairs of Talmudic academies, renowned decisors, and, in the Hasidic world, hereditary rebbes.

Their influence varies considerably: In conservative Orthodox circles, mainly ultra-Orthodox (Haredi) ones, rabbis possess strong authority, and exercise their leadership often. Bodies such as the Council of Torah Sages, Council of Torah Luminaries, the Central Rabbinical Congress, and the Orthodox Council of Jerusalem are all considered, at least in theory, as the supreme arbiters in their respective communities. In the more liberal Orthodox sectors, rabbis are revered and consulted, but rarely exert such direct control.

Daily life
Orthodox Judaism emphasizes practicing rules of kashrut, Shabbat, family purity, and tefilah (daily prayer).

Many Orthodox Jews can be identified by their manner of dress and family lifestyle. Orthodox men and women dress modestly by keeping most of their skin covered. Married women cover their hair, with scarves (tichel), snoods, turbans, hats, berets, or wigs.

Orthodox men are expected to wear a ritual fringe called Tzitzit, and the donning of a head-covering for males at all times is a well-known attribute distinguishing Orthodox Jews. Many men grow beards, and Haredi men wear black hats with a skullcap underneath and suits. Modern Orthodox Jews are sometimes indistinguishable in their dress from general society, although they, too, wear kippahs and tzitzit; additionally, on Shabbat, Modern Orthodox men wear suits (or at least a dress shirt) and dress pants, while women wear fancier dresses or blouses.

Orthodox Jews also follow the laws of negiah, which means "touch". Orthodox men and women do not engage in physical contact with those of the opposite sex outside of their spouse, or immediate family members (such as parents, grandparents, siblings, children, and grandchildren). Kol Isha is the prohibition of a woman's (singing) voice to a man (except as per negiah).

Doorposts have a mezuzah; separate sinks for meat and dairy have become increasingly common.

Diversity and demographics
Diversity

Orthodox Judaism lacks any central framework or a common, authoritative leadership. It is not a "denomination" in the structural sense, but a variegated spectrum of groups, united in broadly affirming several matters of belief and practice, which also share a consciousness and a common discourse. Individual rabbis may, and often do, gain respect across boundaries, especially recognized decisors, but each community eventually obeys or reveres its own immediate leaders (for example, the ultra-Orthodox world shares a sense of common identity, yet constitutes several large distinct sub-sections, each including hundreds of independent communities with their own rabbis). Apart from this inherent plurality, the limits and boundaries of Orthodoxy are also a matter of great controversy. Indeed, the attempt to offer a definition that would encompass all communities and subgroups challenges scholars. Even the moderately conservative subgroups hotly criticize the more liberal ones for deviation from what they consider as inviolable principles, while strict hard-liners merely dismiss the latter as non-Orthodox. Contentious topics range from the abstract and theoretical, like the attitude to the historical-critical study of scripture, to the mundane and pressing, such as modesty rules for women and girls.

As in any other broad religious movement, there is an intrinsic tension between the ideological and the sociological dimensions of Orthodox Judaism – while the leading elites and intellectuals define adherence in theoretical terms, the masses are inducted via societal, familial, and institutional affiliation. Rank-and-file members may often neither be strictly observant nor fully accept the tenets of faith.For an online source: Zev Eleff, The Vanishing Non-Observant Orthodox Jew. Lehrhaus, 8 June 2017.

Demographics

Professors Daniel Elazar and Rela Mintz Geffen, according to calculations in 1990, assumed there to be at least 2,000,000 observant Orthodox Jews worldwide in 2012, and at least 2,000,000 additional nominal members and supporters who identified as such. These figures made Orthodoxy the largest Jewish religious group. Originally, Elazar produced an even higher estimate when he considered association by default and assumed higher affiliation rates, reaching a maximum of 5,500,000 that may be considered involved with Orthodoxy.

In the State of Israel, where the total Jewish population is about 6.5 million, 22% of all Jewish respondents to a 2016 PEW survey declared themselves as observant Orthodox (9% Haredim, or "ultra-Orthodox", 13% Datiim, "religious"). 29% described themselves as "traditional", a label largely implying little observance, but identification with Orthodoxy. The second largest Orthodox concentration is in the United States, mainly in the Northeast and specifically in New York and New Jersey. A 2013 PEW survey found that 10% of respondents identify as Orthodox, in a total Jewish population of at least 5.5 million. 3% were Modern Orthodox, 6% were ultra-Orthodox, and 1% were "other" (Sephardic, liberal Orthodox, etc.) In Britain, of 79,597 households with at least one Jewish member that held synagogue membership in 2016, 66% affiliated with Orthodox synagogues: 53% in "centrist Orthodox", and 13% in "strictly Orthodox" (further 3% were Sephardi, which technically eschews the title "Orthodox").
 
High birth rates are an important aspect of Orthodox demographics: They are the most reproductive of all Jews, and ultra-Orthodox communities have some of the highest rates in the world, with 6 children per an average household. Non-existent levels of intermarriage (unlike some liberal Jewish denominations, Orthodoxy vehemently opposes the phenomenon) also contribute to their growing share in the world's Jewish population. While American Orthodox are but 10% of all Jews, among children, their share rises immensely: An estimated 61% of Jewish children in New York belong to Orthodox households, 49% to ultra-Orthodox. Similar patterns are observed in Britain and other countries. With present trends sustained, Orthodox Jews are projected to numerically dominate British Jewry by 2031, and American Jewry by 2058.Orthodox To Dominate American Jewry In Coming Decades As Population Booms, The Forward, 12 June 2018; Haredi: Half of Britain's Jews will soon be strictly Orthodox, The Independent, 15 October 2015. See also: Haredi Demography – The United States and the United Kingdom, JPPI. However, their growth is balanced by large numbers of members leaving their communities and observant lifestyle. Among the 2013 PEW respondents, 17% of those under 30 who were raised Orthodox disaffiliated (in earlier generations, this trend was far more prevalent, and 77% of those over 65 left).

Groups
Haredim

Orthodox Judaism may be categorized according to varying criteria. The most recognizable sub-group is the Haredim (literally, "trembling" or "fervent"), also known as "strictly Orthodox", and the like. They form the most traditional part of the Orthodox spectrum. Haredim are characterized by a minimal engagement with modern society and culture if not their wholesale rejection, by avowed precedence given to religious values, and by a high degree of rabbinic authority and involvement in daily life. In spite of many differences, Haredi rabbis and communities generally recognize each other as such, and therefore accord respect and legitimacy between them. They are organized in large political structures, mainly Agudath Israel of America and the Israeli United Torah Judaism party. Other organized groups include the Anti-Zionist Central Rabbinical Congress and the Edah HaChareidis. Some Haredim also hold a lukewarm or negative assessment of the more modernist Orthodox. They are easily discerned by their mode of dress, often all black for men and very modest, by religious standards, for women (including hair covering, long skirts, etc.).

Apart from that, the ultra-Orthodox consists of a large spectrum of communities. They may be roughly classified into three different sub-groups.

Hasidic Jews

The first of the three Haredi sub-groups are the Hasidic Jews. The Hasidim originated in 18th-century Eastern Europe, where they formed as a spiritual revival movement that defied the rabbinical establishment. The threat of modernity turned the movement into a bastion of conservatism and reconciled it with other traditionalist elements. Hasidism espouses a mystical interpretation of religion, with each Hasidic community aligned with a hereditary leader known as rebbe (who is almost always, though not necessarily, an ordained rabbi). While the spiritualist element of Hasidism declined somewhat through the centuries, the authority of rebbes is derived from the mystical belief that the holiness of their ancestors is inborn. They exercise tight control over the lives of their followers. Every single one of the several hundreds of independent Hasidic groups/sects (also called "courts" or "dynasties"), from large ones with thousands of member households to very small, has its own line of rebbes. "Courts" often possess unique customs, religious emphases, philosophies, and styles of dress. Hasidic men, especially on the Sabbath, don long garments and fur hats, which were once the staple of all Eastern European Jews, but are now associated almost exclusively with them. As of 2016, there were 130,000 Hasidic households worldwide.

Litvaks
The second Haredi group are the "Litvaks", or "Yeshivish". They originated, in a loose fashion, with the Misnagdim, the opponents of Hasidism, who were mainly concentrated in old Lithuania. The confrontation with the Hasidism bred distinct ideologies and institutions, especially great yeshivas, learning halls, where the study of Torah for its own sake and admiration for the scholars who headed these schools was enshrined. With the advent of secularization, the Misnagdim largely abandoned their hostility towards Hasidism. They became defined by affiliation with their yeshivas, and their communities were sometimes composed of alumni of the same institutes. The great prestige ascribed to those as centers of Torah study (after they were rebuilt in Israel and America, bearing the names of original Eastern European yeshivas destroyed in the Holocaust) swept many of a non-Misnagdic background, and the term "Litvak" lost its ethnic connotation. It is in fact granted to all non-Hasidic Haredim of European (Ashkenazi) descent. The "Litvak" sector is led mainly by heads of yeshivas.

Sephardic Haredim

The third ultra-Orthodox movement is the Sephardic Haredim, who are particularly identified with the Shas party in Israel and the legacy of Rabbi Ovadia Yosef. Originating in the Mizrahi (Middle Eastern and North African Jews) immigrants to the country who arrived in the 1950s, most of the Sephardi Haredim were educated in Litvak yeshivas, both adopting their educators' mentality and developing a distinct identity in reaction to the racism they encountered. Shas arose in the 1980s, with the aim of reclaiming Sephardi religious legacy, in opposition to secularism on one hand and the hegemony of European-descended Haredim on the other. While living in strictly observant circles (there are several hundreds of Sephardic-Haredi communal rabbis), they, unlike the insular Hasidim or Litvaks, maintain a strong bond with the non-Haredi masses of Israeli Mizrahi society.

Modern Orthodoxy

Apart from the Haredim, there are other Orthodox communities. In the West, especially in the United States, Modern Orthodoxy, or "Centrist Orthodoxy", is a broad umbrella term for communities which seek an observant lifestyle and traditional theology, while, at the same time, ascribing positive value to engagement (if not "Synthesis") with the modern world.

In the United States, the Modern Orthodox form a cohesive community and identity group, highly influenced by the legacy of leaders such as Rabbi Joseph B. Soloveitchik, and concentrated around Yeshiva University and institutions like the Orthodox Union or National Council of Young Israel. They affirm strict obedience to Jewish Law, the centrality of Torah study, and the importance of positive engagement with modern culture.

Religious Zionism

In Israel, Religious Zionism represents the largest Orthodox public. While Centrist Orthodoxy's fault-line with the ultra-Orthodox is the attitude to modernity, a fervent adoption of Zionism marks the former. Religious Zionism not only supports the State of Israel, but it also ascribes an inherent religious value to it; the dominant ideological school, influenced by Rabbi Abraham Isaac Kook's thought, regards the state in messianic terms. Religious Zionism is not a uniform group, and fragmentation between its strict and conservative flank (often named "Chardal", or "National-Haredi") and more liberal and open elements has increased since the 1990s. The National Religious Party, once the single political platform, dissolved, and the common educational system became torn on issues such as gender separation in elementary school or secular studies.

European Centrist Orthodoxy
In Europe, "Centrist Orthodoxy" is represented by organizations like the British United Synagogue and the Israelite Central Consistory of France, both the dominant official rabbinates in their respective countries. The laity is often non-observant, retaining formal affiliation due to familial piety or a sense of Jewish identity.

Israeli Masorti (traditional) Jews

Another large demographic usually considered aligned with Orthodoxy are the Israeli Masortim, or "traditional". This moniker originated with Mizrahi immigrants who were both secularized and reverent toward their communal heritage. However, Mizrahi intellectuals, in recent years, developed a more reflective, nuanced understanding of this term, eschewing its shallow image and not necessarily agreeing with the formal deference to Orthodox rabbis. Self-conscious Masorti'' identity is still limited to small, elitist circles.

Chief Rabbinate of Israel

Even more than in Europe's formal state rabbinates, Orthodox Judaism exerts a powerful, transnational authority through its control of the Chief Rabbinate of Israel. Regulating Jewish marriage, conversion, adoption, and dietary standards in the country, the Chief Rabbinate influences both Israel's population and Jews worldwide.

See also

 Hashkafa
 Orthodoxy
 List of Orthodox Jewish communities in the United States

References

External links 

 The State of Orthodox Judaism Today
 Orthodox Jewish population growth and political changes
 Orthodox Retention and Kiruv: The Bad News and the Good News